Irahara Dam is a gravity dam located in Fukuoka Prefecture in Japan. The dam is used for flood control and water supply. The catchment area of the dam is 36.8 km2. The dam impounds about 122  ha of land when full and can store 28700 thousand cubic meters of water. The construction of the dam was started on 1974 and completed in 2017.

References

Dams in Fukuoka Prefecture
2017 establishments in Japan